Tom Rand may refer to:
 Tom Rand (costume designer)
 Tom Rand (venture capitalist)